Cotley may refer to:

Cotley Castle, large Iron Age Hill fort near Dunchideock in Devon, England
Cotley River, small river in Taunton and Berkley, Massachusetts, USA, a tributary of the Taunton River
Scratchbury and Cotley Hills SSSI, biological Site of Special Scientific Interest at Norton Bavant in Wiltshire, England

See also
Coley (disambiguation)
Costley
Courtley